Richard FitzJames (died 1522) was an English academic and administrator who became successively Bishop of Rochester, Bishop of Chichester, and Bishop of London.

Origins
Born about 1442, he was the son of John FitzJames (died 1476), who lived at Redlynch in Somerset, and his wife Alice Newburgh. The judge, Sir John FitzJames was his nephew.

Career
He was principal of St Alban Hall, Oxford from 1477 to 1481 and Vice-Chancellor of Oxford University in 1481 and 1491.

He was nominated to the see of Rochester on 2 January 1497 and consecrated on 21 May 1497, being translated to the see of Chichester on 29 November 1503. He was translated from Chichester to the see of London about 5 June 1506.

He died in London on 15 January 1522, and was buried in a tomb he had prepared for himself in the nave of Old St Paul's Cathedral, with his arms being depicted on the ceiling. During his life he had co-founded a school in his native Somerset, now known as King's School Bruton, which he remembered in his will dated 11 April 1518.

References

 

Bishops of Rochester
16th-century English Roman Catholic bishops
Bishops of Chichester
Bishops of London
Vice-Chancellors of the University of Oxford
Year of birth missing
15th-century births
1522 deaths
15th-century English people
Founders of English schools and colleges
Wardens of Merton College, Oxford
Principals of St Alban Hall, Oxford